DBH-like monooxygenase protein 1, also known as monooxygenase X, is an enzyme that in humans is encoded by the MOXD1 gene.

DBH-like 1 maintains many of the structural features of dopamine beta-monooxygenase DBH. Since Peptidylglycine alpha-hydroxylating monooxygenase (PHM; EC 1.14.17.3) is homologous to dopamine beta-monooxygenase (DBM; EC 1.14.17.1) this concerns a structural basis for a new family of copper type II, significantly specific for ascorbate-dependent monooxygenases based on the corresponding mouse homolog. The pathway of catecholamine synthesis is a possible catecholamine-binding  metabolic copper enzyme domain, a neuron-like property encoding MOX without a signal sequence enzyme metabolism resolving the monooxygenase X chemical pathway of   an unknown substrate, exogenous MOX is not secreted, and it localizes throughout the endoplasmic reticulum, in both endocrine or nonendocrine cells.

Deficiency 

DBH deficiency has been treated effectively with L-threo-3,4-dihydroxyphenylserine (DOPS).

See also 

 Dopamine-beta-hydroxylase-DBH,
 Dopamine beta-monooxygenase-DBM,
 Peptidylglycine alpha-hydroxylating monooxygenase-PHM
 peptidyl-alpha-hydroxyglycine alpha-amidating lyase-PAL
 Tyrosine 3-monooxygenase-TH.

References

Further reading

EC 1.14.17
Human proteins